Matjaž Florijančič (born 18 October 1967 in Kranj) is a former Slovenian association football player.

Career
Florijančič played most of his career in Italy, where he moved in 1991 to sign for Serie A club Cremonese. He then played for several other Serie A and B teams, such as Torino and Empoli. He retired in 2001, after a Serie C2 campaign with Pro Sesto.

Florijančič made 20 appearances for the Slovenia national football team from 1993 to 1999.

Career statistics

Player

See also
Slovenian international players

References

External links

Profile at Lega Serie B

1967 births
Living people
Slovenian footballers
Slovenia international footballers
Yugoslav footballers
Association football forwards
HNK Rijeka players
U.S. Cremonese players
Torino F.C. players
Empoli F.C. players
S.S. Fidelis Andria 1928 players
F.C. Crotone players
S.S.D. Pro Sesto players
Virtus Bergamo Alzano Seriate 1909 players
Yugoslav First League players
Serie A players
Serie B players
Expatriate footballers in Italy
Slovenian expatriate footballers
Slovenian expatriate sportspeople in Italy
Sportspeople from Kranj
HNK Rijeka non-playing staff